Gadanpur Chorsa is a village and Gram panchayat in Bilhaur Tehsil, Kanpur Nagar district, Uttar Pradesh, India. Its village code is 149952. As per 2011 Census of India report the population of the village is 2501 where 1344 are men and 1157 are women.

References

Villages in Kanpur Nagar district